Ladislaus Czettel (born Fülop László Donath; 12 March 1895 – 5 March 1949) was a Hungarian fashion designer, draughtsman and costume designer for stage and film.

Life 
Born in Budapest, Czettel began working as a fashion designer shortly after the end of the First World War. Early activities took him from Budapest to Paris and Vienna. There he made his first contacts as a costume designer (and sketch artist) in the theatre, especially in cabarets and vaudeville. Along the way, Ladislaus Czettel also designed costumes for the first time for (Austrian) films (Miss Hobbs, Das Spielzeug von Paris). From 1923 onwards, he appeared as a costume designer for revues at Viennese and Berlin (Theater des Westens) venues. As artistic advisor to the Deutsches Theater in Berlin (1931/32) and its pendant in Munich (1932/33), he also collaborated with Max Reinhardt, whose production of Jacques Offenbach's La belle Hélène he designed with costumes at Berlin's  in 1931. In 1930, Czettel was also involved in the costume designs for the UFA film Burglars with Lilian Harvey and Willy Fritsch.

Ostracised as a Jew in Germany in 1933, Czettel returned to Austria and continued his theatre activities in Vienna (Theater in der Josefstadt, Vienna State Opera, Burgtheater and the Salzburg Festival until 1937. He also taught as a professor at Vienna's Max Reinhardt Seminar from 1935 to 1938. In 1935, he was commissioned once again for a film, of which an Italian version was also produced.

As a result of the Anschluss in March 1938, Czettel fled abroad to the West. In London, where he had already designed at the London Palladium theatre in 1937, he still designed the costumes for Gabriel Pascal's lavish film version of George Bernard Shaw's Pygmalion in 1938. In mid-1938, Czettel travelled on to the US. There he worked again as a teacher, this time at the Dramatic Workshop of New School for Social Research. At Broadway in New York, Czettel designed the costumes for operettas such as Die Fledermaus (alias Rosalinda, 1942) and Helen Goes to Troy (1944). One week before his 54th birthday, Czettel committed suicide.

Filmography 
 1921: Miss Hobbs
 1925: Das Spielzeug von Paris
 1930: Burglars
 1935: 
 1938: Pygmalion

Further reading 
 Kay Weniger: „Es wird im Leben dir mehr genommen als gegeben …“. Lexikon der aus Deutschland und Österreich emigrierten Filmschaffenden 1933 bis 1945. Eine Gesamtübersicht. ACABUS Verlag, Hamburg 2011, .

References

External links 
 
 -- wrong year of birth there 1904
 Ladislaus Czettel in filmarchiv.at (PDF; 1,1–MB)

Hungarian costume designers
1895 births
1949 deaths
People from Budapest
1949 suicides
Drug-related suicides in New York City